Retail Singles was a weekly music chart compiled and published by Canadian magazine The Record from 1983 to 1996 that ranked the best-selling songs in Canada. Whereas the singles chart of rival magazine RPM was based solely on radio airplay after September 1988, Retail Singles was based on a national sample of single sales reports given by Canadian retailers and rack jobbers. It was regarded in the music industry as the premier Canadian single sales chart for the duration of its publication. The chart was associated with Canada in the Hits of the World section of American magazine Billboard and was featured in Canadian newspapers such as the Montreal Gazette, Winnipeg Sun, and Edmonton Journal.

Retail Singles was first published in the January 10, 1983, issue of The Record, and was dated seven days later. The chart contained thirty positions through the week ending October 24, 1983. It expanded to forty positions on the week ending October 31, 1983, and to fifty positions on the week ending February 11, 1985. From the week ending January 22, 1990, until its discontinuation after the week ending April 1, 1996, Retail Singles contained forty positions. After thirteen years, 2,500 entries, and 193 number ones, The Record ceased publishing the chart due to a lack of sales reports owing to declining single sales in the country. It was succeeded in October 1996 by the Canadian Singles Chart, compiled by SoundScan.

American singer Madonna achieved the most Retail Singles number ones (12), followed by Phil Collins (6), Paula Abdul (5), Michael Jackson (5), and Mariah Carey (5). Five songs tied for the most weeks at number one, with 12: "Faith" by George Michael (1987–1988), "(Everything I Do) I Do It for You" by Bryan Adams (1991), "Said I Loved You...But I Lied" by Michael Bolton (1993–1994), "The Power of Love" by Celine Dion (1994), and "Fantasy" by Carey (1995–1996). Stevie Wonder's "I Just Called to Say I Love You" is the best-performing song of the 1980s and Dion's "The Power of Love" is the best-performing title in Retail Singles history.


Chart history

References

Notes

Footnotes

Citations